Lars Einar Vilhelm Thörn (26 September 1904 – 9 October 1990) was a Swedish sailor who competed in the 1956 and 1964 Summer Olympics.

In 1956 he won the gold medal as part of the Swedish boat Rush V in the 5.5 metre class event. Eight years later he won the silver medal as crew member of the Swedish boat Rush VII in the 5.5 metre class event.

References

External links
 
 
 
 

1904 births
1990 deaths
5.5 Metre class sailors
Swedish male sailors (sport)
Olympic sailors of Sweden
Sailors at the 1956 Summer Olympics – 5.5 Metre
Sailors at the 1964 Summer Olympics – 5.5 Metre
Medalists at the 1964 Summer Olympics
Medalists at the 1956 Summer Olympics
Olympic gold medalists for Sweden
Olympic silver medalists for Sweden
Olympic medalists in sailing
Royal Swedish Yacht Club sailors
People from Eskilstuna
Sportspeople from Södermanland County